The National Parks (Scotland) Act 2000, an Act of the Scottish Parliament, sets out four main aims of the national parks of Scotland. It also lays out criteria for what qualifies a park for National Park status, and the process necessary to create such features. The Act in itself does not establish any new National Parks; it merely creates powers for the designation of National Parks.

Aims of national parks 
Taken from the National Parks (Scotland) Act 2000:

 "to conserve and enhance the natural and cultural heritage of the area."
 "to promote sustainable use of the natural resources of the area."
 "to promote understanding and enjoyment (including enjoyment in the form of recreation) of the special qualities of the area by the public."
 "to promote sustainable economic and social development of the area's communities."

References

External links

Acts of the Scottish Parliament 2000
National parks of Scotland